The Pipers Creek, a watercourse that is part of the Hastings River catchment, is located in the Mid North Coast region of New South Wales, Australia.

Course and features
The river flows generally east by south and then south before reaching its confluence with the Maria River north northeast of Telegraph Point. The river descends  over its  course.

The Pacific Highway transverses the river near Kundabung.

See also

 Rivers of New South Wales
 List of rivers of New South Wales (L-Z)
 List of rivers of Australia

References

External links
 

 

Rivers of New South Wales
Mid North Coast
Kempsey Shire